Braula coeca, the bee louse, is a species of bee louse in the family Braulidae.

References

Braulidae
Insects described in 1818
Diptera of Europe
Diptera of Africa
Diptera of Asia
Diptera of North America
Diptera of South America
Wingless Diptera
Taxa named by Christian Ludwig Nitzsch